The history of the Jews in Indonesia began with the arrival of early European explorers and settlers, and the first Jews arrived in the 17th century. Most Indonesian Jews arrived from Southern Europe, the United Kingdom, the Netherlands, Belgium, Germany, France, the Middle East, North Africa, India, China, and Latin America. Jews in Indonesia presently form a very small Jewish community of about 100–550, of mostly Sephardi Jews. Judaism is not recognized as one of the country's six official religions, and members of the local Jewish community can choose to register as "Belief in One Almighty God" (Indonesian: Kepercayaan Terhadap Tuhan Yang Maha Esa) or another recognized religions on their official identity cards.

Presently, most Indonesian Jews live in Manado on the island of Sulawesi.

History 
In the 1850s, Jewish traveler Jacob Saphir was the first to write about the Jewish community in the Dutch East Indies after visiting Batavia, Dutch East Indies. He had spoken with a local Jew who told him of about 20 Jewish families in the city and several more in Surabaya and Semarang. Most of the Jews living in the Dutch East Indies in the 19th century were Dutch Jews who worked as merchants or were affiliated with the colonial regime. Other members of the Jewish community were immigrants from Iraq or Aden.

Between the two World Wars the number of Jews in the Dutch East Indies was estimated at 2,000 by Israel Cohen. Indonesian Jews suffered greatly under the Japanese Occupation of Indonesia, were interned and forced to work in labor camps. After the war, the released Jews found themselves without their previous property and many emigrated to the United States, Australia or Israel.

By the late 1960s, it was estimated that there were 20 Jews living in Jakarta, 25 in Surabaya and others living in Manado, East Nusa Tenggara, Maluku and Papua.

Population

Assimilation and population changes
The social and cultural characteristics of Indonesia contributed to assimilation. Most Indonesian Jews changed their names to Indonesian names. Jews were obliged to change their names and beliefs. Later Chinese Indonesians were forced to change their names as well, but they are still allowed to practice Buddhism in Indonesia.

Religion in Indonesia is regulated by the government.  Indonesian Jews face the challenge of declaring a religion on their government ID cards called KTP (Kartu Tanda Penduduk). Every citizen over the age of 17 must carry a KTP, which includes the holder's religion and Indonesia only recognizes six religions, none of which is Judaism.  Reportedly, many Jews who have registered a religion have registered as Christians.

An estimated 20,000 descendants of Jews still live in Indonesia, though many are losing their historical identity. Since most Indonesian Jews are actually Jews from Southern Europe and Middle East Area, the languages spoken by them include Indonesian, Malay, Arabic, Hebrew, Portuguese and Spanish.

Synagogues

The Indonesian Jewish community is very tiny, with most members living in the capital of Jakarta and the rest in Surabaya. Many Jewish cemeteries still exist around the country in Semarang (center of Java), in Pangkalpinang in Bangka Island, in Palembang south of Sumatra, and in Surabaya.

Torat Chaim, Jakarta
A small congregation led by Rabbi Tovia Singer, previously the only rabbi in present-day Indonesia.  It operates in conjunction with the Eits Chaim Indonesia Foundation, the only Jewish organization in Indonesia to have official sanction, under the auspices of the Christian Desk, from the Religious Affairs Department of Indonesia.

Surabaya synagogue

There was a synagogue in Surabaya, provincial capital of East Java in Indonesia. For many years it was the only synagogue in the country. The synagogue became inactive beginning 2009 and had no Torah scrolls or rabbi. It was located in Jalan Kayun 6 on a 2.000 m2 lot near the Kali Mas river in house built in 1939 during Dutch rule.

The home was bought by the local Jewish community from a Dutch doctor in 1948 and transformed into a synagogue. Only the mezuzah and 2 Stars of David in the entrance showed the presence of the synagogue. The community in Surabaya is no longer big enough to support a minyan, a gathering of ten men needed in order to conduct public worship. The synagogue was demolished, to its foundation, in 2013.

Tondano synagogue

Since 2003, Shaar Hashamayim synagogue has been serving the local Jewish community of some 30-50 people in Tondano city, Minahasa Regency, North Sulawesi. Currently it is the only synagogue in Indonesia that provides services. A tiny local Jewish community remains in the area, composed mostly of those who rediscovered their ancestral roots and converted back to Judaism.

Indonesian Jews 

 Yapto Soerjosoemarno, prominent Indonesian politician who has a Dutch-Jewish mother
 Yaakov Baruch, Indonesian rabbi of Dutch-Jewish descent
 , 20th-century Indonesian businessman and independence activist of Iraqi-Jewish descent
 , Indonesian lawyer of Iraqi-Jewish descent
 , Indonesian Zionist activist

See also 

 Israelitische Gemeente Soerabaia
 List of Asian Jews
 Secular Jewish culture
 Jainism in Southeast Asia
 Hinduism in Southeast Asia

References

External links 
The Museum of the Jewish People at Beit Hatfutsot: The Jewish Community of Indonesia
The Jews of Surabaya
"In a Sliver of Indonesia, a Public Embrace of Judaism", The New York Times
 Jakarta Post: "Story behind RI's sole synagogue"
 The Museum of the Jewish People at Beit Hatfutsot : The Synagogue of Surabaya
 Penganut Yahudi tanpa sinagoge

Religion in the Dutch Empire
Dutch East Indies
Jewish
Indonesia
Immigration to Indonesia
History
 

id:Yahudi di Indonesia#Sejarah